Agoma is a monotypic moth genus of the family Noctuidae erected by Sergius G. Kiriakoff in 1977. Its only species, Agoma trimenii, or Trimen's false tiger, was first described by Rudolf Felder in 1874. It is known from most countries of subtropical Africa.

References 

Agaristinae
Noctuoidea genera
Monotypic moth genera
Moths of Africa